Thread Control Block (TCB) is a data structure in the operating system kernel which contains thread-specific information needed to manage it. The TCB is "the manifestation of a thread in an operating system."

An example of information contained within a TCB is:
 Thread Identifier: Unique id (tid) is assigned to every new thread
 Stack pointer: Points to thread's stack in the process
 Program counter: Points to the current program instruction of the thread
 State of the thread (running, ready, waiting, start, done)
 Thread's register values
 Pointer to the Process control block (PCB) of the process that the thread lives on

The Thread Control Block acts as a library of information about the threads in a system. Specific information is stored in the thread control block highlighting important information about each process.

See also 
 Parallel Thread Execution
 Process control block (PCB)

Operating system kernels